Count Basie and the Kansas City 7 is an album by American jazz bandleader and pianist Count Basie featuring small group performances recorded in 1962 for the Impulse! label.

Reception
The AllMusic review by Scott Yanow awarded the album 4 stars stating "One of Count Basie's few small-group sessions of the '60s was his best".  In a contemporaneous review in the October 11, 1962 issue of Down Beat magazine, Leonard Feather rated the album at 4.5 stars.

Track listing
 "Oh, Lady Be Good!" (George Gershwin, Ira Gershwin) – 4:40
 "Secrets" (Frank Wess) – 4:08
 "I Want a Little Girl" (Murray Mencher, Billy Moll) – 4:16
 "Shoe Shine Boy" (Sammy Cahn, Saul Chaplin) – 4:07
 "Count's Place" (Count Basie) – 5:28
 "Senator Whitehead" (Wess) – 4:12
 "Tally-Ho, Mr. Basie!" (Basie) – 4:28
 "What'cha Talkin'?" (Thad Jones) – 4:59
Recorded at Van Gelder Studio in Englewood Cliffs, New Jersey on March 21, 1962 (tracks 2, 6 & 8), and March 22, 1962 (tracks 1, 3-5 & 7)

Personnel
Count Basie – piano, organ
Thad Jones – trumpet
Frank Wess – flute, alto flute (tracks 2, 6 & 8)
Frank Foster – tenor saxophone, clarinet (tracks 1, 3-5 & 7)
Eric Dixon – tenor saxophone, flute, clarinet
Freddie Green – guitar
Eddie Jones – bass
Sonny Payne – drums

Production
Pete Turner - photography

References

Impulse! Records albums
Count Basie albums
1962 albums
Albums produced by Bob Thiele
Albums recorded at Van Gelder Studio